Hasan Teymur-e Olya (also Romanized as Ḩasan Teymūr-e ‘Olyā; also known as Hasan Taīmūr, Ḩasan Ta‘mīr, Ḩasan Tamūr, and Ḩasan Teymūr) is a village in Pir Taj Rural District, Chang Almas District, Bijar County, Kurdistan Province, Iran. At the 2006 census, its population was 550, in 128 families. The village is populated by Azerbaijanis.

References 

Towns and villages in Bijar County
Azerbaijani settlements in Kurdistan Province